The National Liberal Party (PNL) is a political party in the Republic of Moldova. It was founded in 1993 but temporarily disappeared through political amalgamation in 2000 before being refounded in 2006.

It is not officially recognised by the National Liberal Party of Romania (PNL) and therefore does not have the right to share the historical tradition of the prewar party of the same name, which was forcibly dissolved in 1947 in post-war Romania by the Romanian Communist Party (PCR) after the Soviet annexation of Bessarabia.

Political agenda 
The party supports the unification of the Republic of Moldova with Romania and shares copies the identity and ideology of the traditional party in neighbouring Romania. Nonetheless, very much unlike the Romanian PNL (which is dominant on the centre-right as well as Romania's second largest political party), the Moldovan PNL might actually be considered a micro party with respect to Moldovan politics. In addition to support for political union with Romania, as an interim measure, the PNL supports EU and NATO membership for Moldova. In early 2020, the PNL became one of the founding members of Mișcarea Politică Unirea (MPU), a political party established purposely for the unification of Romania and Moldova.

Electoral history 

Notes:

1 

2 

3

See also 

 Liberalism by country
 Liberalism in Moldova
 Liberalism and radicalism in Romania
 National Liberal Party (Romania, 1875)

References 

 PNL leaflet - 1
 PNL leaflet - 1

External links
Official website

 
Political parties established in 1993
Political parties established in 2006
Liberal parties in Moldova
1993 establishments in Moldova
Romanian nationalism in Moldova